Main Dilli Hoon is 1998 television series on DD National from the Raj Babbar and Nadira Babbar Production House and directed by Nadira Babbar. The first episode started with the story of Yayati played by actor Raj Babbar and covered the major eras till the Mughal period in Delhi. Other prominent actors in the series were Shahbaz Khan (as Prithviraj Chauhan), Vaishnavi Mahant (as Princess Samyukta), and Javed Khan (as Qutbu l-Din Aibak).

Cast 

 Sharat Saxena as Shukracharya
 Raj Babbar as Maharaj Yayati
 Shahbaz Khan as Maharaj Prithviraj Chauhan
 Vaishnavi Mahant as Rajkumari / Maharani Samyukta
 Deep Dhillon as Maharaj Jaichand
 Javed Khan as Qutbu l-Din Aibak
 Anil Yadav as Muhammad of Ghor
 Daman Mann as Alha
 Nimai Bali as Maharaj Parikshit
 Parikshit Sahni as Maharaj Bharat
 Anang Desai as Maharaj Anangpal Tomar
 Sudhir Dalvi as Mahamantri Yuyutsu
 Priyanka as Maharani Sharmishtha
 Geeta Gore as Maharani Devyani
 Jiten Lalwani as Yuvraj Janamejaya
 Vikrant Chaturvedi as Astika
 Rammohan Sharma
 Jitendra Trehan
 Adarsh Gautam
 Pankaj Berry

References 

Indian television series
1998 Indian television series debuts
1999 Indian television series endings
Indian period television series
Indian historical television series
DD National original programming